McClard is a surname. Notable people with the surname include:

Bill McClard (born 1950), American football player
Kent McClard (born 1967), American record label owner and music journalist

See also
McClary